Dejene (also Dejen or Dejenee) is a male name of Ethiopian origin that may refer to:

Dejene Berhanu (1980–2010), Ethiopian long-distance runner
Dejene Yirdaw (born 1978), Ethiopian marathon runner
Dejen Gebremeskel (born 1989), Ethiopian long-distance runner
Dejenee Regassa (born 1989), Ethiopian long-distance runner competing for Bahrain

Amharic-language names